Company of Thieves were an American indie rock band from Chicago, Illinois, founded by Genevieve Schatz (vocals) and Marc Walloch (guitar). Their first album, Ordinary Riches, was released independently in 2007 and re-released in 2009. Their second album, Running from a Gamble, was released in 2011. The band announced they had no plans to record any new music as of January 2014, but announced a reunion in May 2017.

History
They have been featured as an iTunes Discovery Download for their song "Oscar Wilde", as well as in their Indie Spotlight: Rock/Alternative – featuring the album alongside the recommended track, "Pressure". They also won the 2007 New York Songwriters Circle contest for "Oscar Wilde".

The band's debut album Ordinary Riches was released independently on May 29, 2007 and debuted on Billboard'''s Heatseekers Chart at No. 5. After signing with Wind-up Records the album was digitally re-released on January 6, 2009. A CD release was made available on February 24, 2009.

In January 2009, Genevieve and Marc appeared on "Live from Daryl's House", Daryl Hall's monthly Internet concert, as Company of Thieves.  They performed "Pressure", "Even in the Dark", "Past the Sleep" and "Around the Block" from their debut album, along with Hall & Oates songs "Starting All Over Again" and "Everytime You Go Away", as well as other covers. They also performed on Last Call with Carson Daly in February.

Company of Thieves' single "Oscar Wilde" was featured on "Gossip Girl: Real NY Stories Revealed" as part of the Dove Go Fresh campaign, as well as being aired during an episode of Gossip Girl.

Their second album, Running from a Gamble, was released on May 17, 2011. The lead single, "Death of Communication", was released on March 15, 2011.

The band went through several line-up changes during its history. They began as a trio with founding members Genevieve Schatz and Marc Walloch alongside drummer Mike Ortiz. In 2011 Ortiz posted a formal letter to his fans on the official website of Company of Thieves stating his decision to depart from the band. Chris Faller (former bassist of The Hush Sound) was used as bassist on Company of Thieves' last album, "Running from a Gamble". Faller played drums for the band's live performances after Mike Ortiz left along with bassist Marcin Sulewski. On their 2012 tour, Company of Thieves appeared with Chris Faller as bassist on stage along with a new drummer, Matt Rullo. Eitan Bernstein did not play keyboards on the second album, but toured with the band as the official keyboardist.

On January 9, 2014, an official email was sent by Genevieve confirming that there were no plans to record any further Company of Thieves albums.

On May 21, 2017, Company of Thieves updated their Facebook page with a new band photo of Schatz, Walloch, Faller, and another photo with "Company of Thieves Fall 2017" confirming a reunion.  A reunion tour in September 2017 was announced in July, as well as a forthcoming single.

On July 28, 2017, a new single entitled "Treasure" was made available for download. An 11-city tour ran from Tuesday, September 12 in Indianapolis, Indiana, to September 30 in Los Angeles. Walloch stated in an interview with axs.com that the band intended to work on writing music for new singles/an EP after the reunion tour finished and future tours would follow.

Members
Current
 Genevieve Schatz – vocals
 Marc Walloch – guitar
 Chris Faller  – bass, drums, keyboards

Touring
 Mike Maimone – keyboards
 Brendan McCusker – drums

Former
 Dorian Duffy – bass
 Mike Ortiz – drums
 Scott Heatherly – keyboards
 Jimmy Ratke – drums
 Brad Sawicki – bass
 Mike Maimone – keyboards
 Bob Buckstaff – bass
 Marcin Sulewski – bass
 Eitan Bernstein – keyboards
 Matt Rullo – drums

Discography
Studio albums

Singles

 EPs The Acoustic EP (2007)

Awards
Independent Music Awards 2012: Running from a Gamble'' – Best Indie/Alt. Album

References

External links

Company of Thieves on Live From Daryl's House

Wind-up Records artists
Musical groups established in 2007
Musical groups disestablished in 2014
Indie rock musical groups from Illinois
Alternative rock groups from Chicago
2007 establishments in Illinois
Musical groups reestablished in 2017